The following is a list of characters created by and featured in various Hanna-Barbera productions and series:

2 Stupid Dogs (1993–1995)
2 Stupid Dogs

 Big Dog
 Little Dog
 Mr. Hollywood
 The Kitten
 Red Riding Hood
 Grandma
 The Wolf
 The Witch
 Secret Squirrel
 Morocco Mole
 The Chief 
 Penny the Squirrel
 Kenny Fouler
 Buffy Zigenhagen

The All New Popeye Hour (1978–1983)
The All New Popeye Hour

 Alice the Goon
 Bluto
 Col. Crumb
 Dinky
 Eugene the Jeep
 Olive Oyl
 Monica
 Pipeye
 Peepeye
 Popeye
 Poopdeck Pappy
 Poopeye
 Pupeye
 Sandy
 Sgt. Bertha Blast
 Swee%27Pea
 Uncle Dudley
 Wimpy

The Amazing Chan and the Chan Clan (1972)
The Amazing Chan and the Chan Clan

 Charlie Chan
 Henry Chan
 Stanley Chan
 Suzie Chan
 Alan Chan
 Anne Chan
 Tom Chan
 Flip Chan
 Nancy Chan
 Mimi Chan
 Scooter Chan
 Chu Chu

The Atom Ant Show (1965–1967)
The Atom Ant Show

 Atom Ant
 Precious Pupp
 Granny Sweet
 The Hillbilly Bears
 Paw Rugg
 Maw Rugg
 Floral Rugg
 Shag Rugg

The Banana Splits (1968–1970, 2008)
The Banana Splits

 Fleegle
 Bingo
 Drooper
 Snorky
 The Banana Vac
 Cuckoo Clock
 Goofy Gopher
 The Sour Grapes Bunch
 The Dilly Sisters

The Berenstain Bears (1985–1987)
The Berenstain Bears

Actual Factual
Bigpaw 
Brother Bear
Cousin Freddy
Farmer Ben
Grizzly Gramps
Grizzly Gran
Grumpy Grizzly
Henchweasels
Jake
Lazy Grizzly
Lizzy Bruin
Mama Bear
Mayor Honeypot
Miss Bearson
Mrs. Ben
Officer Marguerite
Papa Q. Bear
Parter Pete
Queen Nectar
Raffish Ralph
Sister Bear
Teacher Jane
Too Tall
Weasel McGreed

Birdman and the Galaxy Trio (1967–1969)
Birdman and the Galaxy Trio

 Birdman 
 Avenger
 Falcon 7 
 Birdboy 
 Birdgirl 
 Gravity Girl 
 Meteor Man
 Vapor Man

The Biskitts (1983)
The Biskitts
 Waggs
 Sweets
 Shiner
 Lady
 Bump
 Scat
 Mooch
 Wiggles
 Spinner
 King Max
 Shecky
 Scratch

Butch Cassidy and the Sundance Kids (1973)
Butch Cassidy and the Sundance Kids

Butch Cassidy
Merilee
Wally
Steffi
Elvis
Mr. Socrates

CB Bears
CB Bears

 Hustle
 Bump
 Boogie
 Charlie
 Undercover Elephant
 Loud Mouse
 Chief
 Shake the Ghost
 Rattle the Ghost
 Roll the Ghost
 the Ghost Mouse
 Mordicat
 Sidney Merciless the Ghost Exterminator
 Heyyy It's the King
 The King
 Skids
 Yukayuka
 Big H
 Clyde
 Zelda
 Sheena
 Crazy Legs
 Blast-Off Buzzard
 Posse Impossible
 Sheriff
 Stick
 Blubber
 Big Duke
 Miss Lil'
 Mother Lode

Captain Caveman and the Teen Angels (1977–1980)
Captain Caveman and the Teen Angels

 Captain Caveman
 Brenda Chance
 Dee Dee Skyes
 Taffy Dare

Captain Planet and the Planeteers (1990–1996)
Captain Planet and the Planeteers

Captain Planet
Gaia
Gi
Kwame
Linka
Ma-Ti
Wheeler

The Cartoon Cartoon Show (1995)
The Cartoon Cartoon Show

 Pfish and Chip
 Blammo the Clown
 Eustace and Muriel
 Gramps and his grandchildren
 Larry and Steve
 Godfrey and Zeek
 Zoonatiks and Mr. Hackensack
 Fat Cats (Louie and Elmo)
 Hard Luck Duck and Crocodile Harley
 Pizza Boy and Tumbleweed Tex
 Boid and Worm
 Bloo, Simon, and Scully
 The Ignoramooses (Sherwood and Pomeroy)
 Malcolm and Melvin
 Mina and the Count
 Johnny the Worm and Sally
 Robots
 Yuckie Duck and Sledgehammer O'Possum
 Yoink of the Yukon
 Shake and Flick
 Jof
 Snoot the Flea and Al the Dog

Casper and the Space Angels (1979)
Casper and the Angels

Casper
Hairy Scary
Mini
Maxi
Commander
Nerdley
Fungo

Clue Club (1976–1977)
Clue Club

 Larry
 D.D.
 Pepper
 Dottie
 Woofer
 Wimper
 Sheriff Bagley

The Completely Mental Misadventures of Ed Grimley  (1988)
The Completely Mental Misadventures of Ed Grimley

 Ed Grimley
 Ms. Malone
 Leo Freebus
 Deidre Freebus
 Wendell Malone
 Roger  Gustav
 Emil Gustav
 Count Floyd (live actor)

Cow and Chicken (1997–1999)
Cow and Chicken

 Cow
 Chicken
 Mom
 Dad
 The Red Guy
 Cerberus
 Flem
 Earl
 Boneless Chicken
 Teacher

Daisy-Head Mayzie (1995)
Daisy-Head Mayzie

 The Cat in the Hat
 Daisy-Head Mayzie/Mayzie McGrew

Dastardly and Muttley in Their Flying Machines (1969–1971)
Dastardly and Muttley in Their Flying Machines

 Dick Dastardly
 Muttley
 Klunk
 Zilly
 General
 Yankee Doodle Pigeon

Devlin (1974)
Devlin

 Ernie Devlin
 Tod Devlin
 Sandy Devlin
 Henry 'Hank' McSummers

Dexter's Laboratory (1996–2003)
Dexter's Laboratory

 Dexter
 Dee Dee
 Mandark
 Beau
 Mom
 Dad
 Monkey
 Major Glory
 The Infraggable Krunk
 Valhallen
 Koosalagoopagoop

Dinky Dog (1978–1981)
Dinky Dog

Dinky
Uncle Dudley
Sandy
Monica

Droopy, Master Detective (1993)
Droopy, Master Detective

Droopy
Dripple
Miss Vavoom
Screwball Squirrel
Lightning Bolt the Super Squirrel
Wild Mouse

Dynomutt, Dog Wonder (1976–1977)
Dynomutt, Dog Wonder

 Dynomutt, Dog Wonder
 Radley Crown/The Blue Falcon

The Flintstones and related spin-offs (1960–present)
The Flintstones

 Fred Flintstone
 Wilma Flintstone
 Pebbles Flintstone
 Dino
 Woolly
 Barney Rubble
 Betty Rubble
 Bamm Bamm Rubble
 Hoppy
 Snoots
 George Nate Slate
 The Great Gazoo
 The Gruesomes
 Weirdly Gruesome
 Creepella Gruesome
 Goblin "Gobby" Gruesome
 Schneider
 Joe Rockhead
 Mr. Slate

Foofur (1986–1988)
Foofur

Annabell
Baby
Bernie
Bertie
Blaze
Boombah
Brenda
Brigette
Brisbane
Burt
Celia
Chucky
Cleo
Dobkins
Dolly
Duke
Fencer
Fritz-Carlos
Foofur
Hazel
Harvey
Irma
Jojo
Killer
Lorenzo
Louis
Lucy
Mel
Mrs. Escrow
Mr. Mutton
Muffy
Norris
Obscura
Otto
Pam
Pepe
Phyllis
Rocki
Rover Cleveland
Sam
Sarge
Trendy
Tugboat
Vinnie
Willy

Godzilla (1978–1981)
Godzilla

Godzilla
Godzooky
Captain Carl Majors
Brock Borden
Dr. Quinn Darien
Pete Darien

Goober and the Ghost Chasers (1973–1975)
Goober and the Ghost Chasers
Goober
Ted
Tina
Gillie

The Great Grape Ape Show (1975–1978)
The Great Grape Ape Show
The Great Grape Ape
Beegle Beagle

The Hanna–Barbera New Cartoon Series (1962)
The Hanna-Barbera New Cartoon Series

 Lippy the Lion and Hardy Har Har
 Touché Turtle and Dum Dum
 Wally Gator

Help!... It's the Hair Bear Bunch! (1971–1974)
Help!... It's the Hair Bear Bunch!

 Hair Bear
 Square Bear
 Bubi Bear
 Eustace P. Peevly
 Lionel J. Botch
 Superintendent

The Herculoids (1967–1969, 1981–1982)
The Herculoids
 Zandor
 Tarra
 Dorno
 Zok
 Igoo
 Tundro
 Gloop and Gleep

Hong Kong Phooey (1974–1976)
Hong Kong Phooey

 Penrod "Penry" Pooch/Hong Kong Phooey
 Sargeant Flint
 Rosemary
 Spot

The Huckleberry Hound Show (1958–1962)
The Huckleberry Hound Show

 Huckleberry Hound
 Yogi Bear
 Boo-Boo Bear
 Cindy Bear
 Ranger Smith
 Pixie & Dixie
 Mr. Jinks
 Hokey Wolf
 Ding-A-Ling Wolf

I Am Weasel (1997–2000)
I Am Weasel

 I.M. Weasel
 I.R. Baboon
 The Red Guy
 Loulabelle
 Jolly Roger
 Admiral Bullets
 ShytHead

The Impossibles (1966)
The Impossibles

 Coil Man
 Fluid Man
 Multi-Man
 Big D

Inch High Private Eye
Inch High, Private Eye
 Inch High
 Lori
 Gator
 Braveheart

Jabberjaw (1976–1978)
Jabberjaw

 Jabberjaw
 Biff
 Shelly
 Bubbles
 Clamhead

Jana of the Jungle (1978)
Jana of the Jungle

Jana
Montaro
Ghost
Tico
Dr. Ben Cooper

Jeannie (1973–1975)
Jeannie

Jeannie
Babu
Corey Anders
Henry Glopp
The Great Hadji, Master of All Genies
Mrs. Lindsay Anders
S. Melvin Farthinghill

The Jetsons (1962–1987)
The Jetsons

 George Jetson
 Jane Jetson
 Judy Jetson
 Elroy Jetson
 Astro
 Orbitty
 Rosie the Robot
 Henry Orbit
 Cosmo G. Spacely
 Spencer Cogswell
 R.U.D.I.
 Uniblab

Johnny Bravo (1997–2004)
Johnny Bravo

 Johnny Bravo
 Bunny Bravo
 Suzy
 Carl
 Pops
 Bobo

Jonny Quest (1964–1965)
Jonny Quest

 Jonny Quest
 Hadji
 Dr. Benton Quest
 Race Bannon
 Jessie Bannon
 Bandit

Josie and the Pussycats (1970–1972)
Josie and the Pussycats

 Josie McCoy
 Valerie Brown
 Melody Valentine
 Alan M. Mayberry
 Alexander Cabot III
 Alexandra Cabot and her cat, Sebastian

The Kwicky Koala Show (1981)
The Kwicky Koala Show

Kwicky Koala
Wilford Wolf
Crazy Claws
Rawhide Clyde 
Bristletooth
Ranger Rangerfield
Dirty Dawg
Ratso
Officer Bullhorn
George 
Joey

Loopy De Loop (1959–1965)
Loopy De Loop

 Loopy De Loop

Magilla Gorilla (1963–1967)
Magilla Gorilla

 Magilla Gorilla
 Mr. Peebles
 Ogee
 Punkin Puss
 Mushmouse
 Ricochet Rabbit
 Droop-A-Long Coyote

Moby Dick and Mighty Mightor (1967–1969)
Moby Dick and Mighty Mightor

 Mightor/Tor
 Sheera
 Lil' Rock
 Tog
 Ork
 Pondo
 Moby Dick
 Tom
 Tub
 Scooby the Seal

The New Adventures of Captain Planet (1993–1996)
The New Adventures of Captain Planet

 Captain Planet
 Gaia
 Kwame
 Wheeler
 Linka
 Gi
 Ma-Ti
 Suchi

Once Upon a Forest (1993)
Once Upon a Forest

 The Furlings (Abigail, Edgar, Russell)
 Cornelius
 Michelle
 Phineas
 Willy
 Waggs
 Bosworth

Pac-Man (1982–1984)
Pac-Man

Pac-Man
Pepper (Ms. Pac-Man)
Pac-Baby
Chomp-Chomp
Sour-Puss
Super Pac
P.J.
Mezmeron
Inky
Blinky
Pinky
Clyde
Sue
Dinky

The Perils of Penelope Pitstop (1969–1971)
The Perils of Penelope Pitstop

 Penelope Pitstop
 The Ant Hill Mob (Clyde, Dum Dum, Zippy, Pockets, Yak Yak, Snoozy, Softie)
 Chug-a-Boom (The Ant Hill Mob's car)
 Sylvester Sneekly (a.k.a. The Hooded Claw)
 The Bully Brothers

Peter Potamus Show (1964–1965)
The Peter Potamus Show

 Peter Potamus
 So-So
 Yippee
 Yappee
 Yahooey
 Breezly
 Sneezly

Pink Panther and Sons (1984–1985)
Pink Panther and Sons

Anney O'Gizmo
Bowlhead
Buckethead
Chatta
Finko
Howl
Murfel
Panky
Pink Panther
Pinky
Punkin
Rocko

Pound Puppies (1985, 1986–1987)

Pound Puppies

 Cooler
 Nose-Marie
 Bright Eyes
 Whopper
 Howler
 Holly
 Katrina Stoneheart
 Bratina
 Catgut
 Captain Slaughter

The Powerpuff Girls (1998-2005)

The Powerpuff Girls
The Powerpuff Girls
Blossom
Bubbles
Buttercup
Professor Utonium
Mayor
Ms. Bellum
Miss Keane
Rainbow the Clown a.k.a. Mr. Mime 
Mojo Jojo
Him
Fuzzy Lumpkins
Princess Morbucks
The Gangreen Gang
Ace
Snake
Lil' Arturo
Grubber 
Big Billy
The Amoeba Boys
Bossman
Junior
Slim
Sedusa
The Rowdyruff Boys
Brick 
Boomer 
Butch

The Quick Draw McGraw Show  (1959–1961)
The Quick Draw McGraw Show
 Quick Draw McGraw
 Baba Looey
 Augie Doggie and Doggie Daddy
Augie Doggie
Doggie Daddy
 Snooper and Blabber
 Super Snooper
 Blabber Mouse

The Roman Holidays  (1972)
The Roman Holidays

 Augustus "Gus" Holiday
 Laurie Holiday
 Happius "Hap" Holiday
 Precocia Holiday
 Evictus (the landlord)
 Groovia
 Brutus the Lion
 Mr. Tycoonius

The Ruff and Reddy Show  (1957–1960)
The Ruff and Reddy Show

 Ruff
 Reddy
 Professor Gizmo
 Ubble Ubble
 Captain Greedy
 Salt Water Daffy
 Harry Safari

Scooby-Doo and related spin-offs (1969–present)
Scooby-Doo

 Scooby-Doo
 Shaggy Rogers
 Velma Dinkley
 Daphne Blake
 Fred Jones
 Scooby-Dum
 Yabba-Doo
 Scooby-Dee
 Scrappy-Doo
 Mystery Machine
 Vincent Van Ghoul
 Flim Flam
 Weerd and Bogel
Meako, Shreako and Freako
Sadie-Mae Scroggins
Billy-Bob Scroggins
Matches, Sibella, Elsa Frankenteen, Winnie, Phantasma and Tanis
Miss Grimwood
Googie
Detective Beau Neville
 The Hex Girls
 Crystal and Amber
 Red Herring
 Mary Jane
 Patrick Wisely

Sealab 2020 (1972)
Sealab 2020

Captain Michael "Mike" Murphy
Paul Williams
Lieutenant Sparks
Robert Murphy
Sally Murphy
Hal
Gail
Ed

The Secret Squirrel Show (1965–1968)
The Secret Squirrel Show

 Secret Squirrel
 Morocco Mole
 Chief Double-Q 
 Squiddly Diddly
 Chief Winchley      
 Winsome Witch

Shazzan (1967)
Shazzan

 Shazzan
 Chuck
 Nancy
 Kaboobie

The Skatebirds (1977–1978)
The Skatebirds

Knock-Knock
Satchel
Scooter
Scat Cat

The Smurfs (1981–1990)
The Smurfs
 List of The Smurfs characters

Snorks (1984)
Snorks

 List of Snorks characters

Space Ghost and Dino Boy (1966–1968)
Space Ghost and Dino Boy

 Space Ghost
 Jan
 Jace
 Blip
 Moltar
 Brak
 Zorak
 Dino Boy
 Ugh the caveman
 Bronty the baby Brontosaurus

The Space Kidettes (1966-1967)
The Space Kidettes
 Scooter
 Jenny
 Countdown
 Snoopy
 Pup star
 Captain Sky hook
 Static

Speed Buggy (1973)
Speed Buggy
Speed Buggy
Mark
Debbie
Tinker

SWAT Kats: The Radical Squadron (1993–1994)
SWAT Kats: The Radical Squadron

 Chance "T-Bone" Furlong
 Jake "Razor" Clawson
 Deputy Mayor Calico "Callie" Briggs
 Mayor Manx
 Commander Ulysses Feral
 Lieutenant Commander Steele
 Lieutenant Felina Feral
 The Enforcer Sergeant
 Dark Kat
 Dr. Viper
 Mac and Molly Mange, the Metalikats
 The Pastmaster
 Hard Drive
 Lenny Ringtail/Madkat
 Turmoil
 Dr. Harley Street
 The Dark SWAT Kats
 Dr. Abby Sinian
 Henson, Sinian's assistant
 Randall
 Professor Hackle
 Ann Gora
 Jonny K.
 Al
 David Litterbin
 Burke and Murray
 Little old lady
 Talon and Lem
 Tiger Conklin
 Taylor
 Fango
 Kascratch and his gang
 Captain Grimalken

Teen Force
Teen Force

Kid Comet
Moleculad
Elektra
Plutem
Glax
Uglor

These Are the Days (1974–1975)
These Are the Days

 Homer
 Kathy Day
 Danny Day
 Jeff Day
 Martha Day
 Ben Day

Tom and Jerry shows and specials (1940–1958, 1975, 1990–1993, 2001)
Tom and Jerry (1940–1958) / The Tom and Jerry Show (1975) / Tom and Jerry Kids / The Mansion Cat

 Tom the Cat
 Jerry the Mouse
 Spike the Bulldog
 Tyke the Dog
 Butch
 Lightning
 Meathead
 Topsy
 Nibbles the Mouse (later called Tuffy, but still sometimes called Nibbles)
 Quacker
 Droopy

Top Cat (1961–1962)
Top Cat

 Top Cat ("T.C.")
 Benny the Ball
 Brain
 Choo Choo
 Fancy-Fancy
 Spook
 Officer Dibble

Valley of the Dinosaurs (1974–1976)
Valley of the Dinosaurs

 John Butler
 Kim Butler
 Katie Butler
 Greg Butler
 Digger
 Gorak
 Tana
 Lok
 Gara
 Glump

Wacky Races (1968–1970)
Wacky Races

 Dick Dastardly and Muttley
 Penelope Pitstop
 Peter Perfect
 Rock and Gravel Slag
 Big Gruesome and Little Gruesome (also known as the Gruesome Twosome)
 Professor Pat Pending
 The Red Max
 Sergeant Blast and Private Meekly
 The Ant Hill Mob (Clyde, Ring-A-Ding, Danny, Kurby, Mac, Rug Bug Benny, and Willy)
 Lazy Luke and Blubber Bear
 Rufus Ruffcut and Sawtooth

Wait Till Your Father Gets Home (1972–1974)
Wait Till Your Father Gets Home

 Harry Boyle
 Irma Boyle
 Alice Boyle
 Chet Boyle
 Jamie Boyle
 Ralph Kane
 Sara "Sergeant" Whittaker

Wheelie and the Chopper Bunch (1974–1975)
Wheelie and the Chopper Bunch

 Wheelie
 Rota Ree
 Chopper
 Revs
 Hi-Riser
 Scrambles
 Captain Tough
 Officer Fishtail

Where's Huddles? (1970)
Where's Huddles?

 Ed Huddles
 Marge Huddles
 Bubba McCoy
 Penny McCoy
 Claude Pertwee
 Freight Train
 Pom Pom Huddles
 Fumbles the dog
 Beverly the cat
 Mad Dog Maloney

The Yogi Bear Show and related spin-offs (1961–present)
The Yogi Bear Show

 Yogi Bear
 Boo-Boo Bear
 Cindy Bear
 Ranger Smith
 Yakky Doodle
 Chopper
 Fibber Fox
 Alfy Gator
 Snagglepuss

See also 
 Hanna-Barbera
 Cartoon Network Studios
 Craig McCracken
 Dr. Seuss
 Theatrically released films based on Hanna-Barbera animations
 DePatie-Freleng Enterprises
 Lauren Faust
 Metro-Goldwyn-Mayer cartoon studio
 Warner Bros. Cartoons
 Warner Bros. Animation

External links 
 Production listings: Toonopedia, Internet Movie Database.

 List of characters
 List of characters
 Hanna-Barbera characters, List of
Hanna-Barbera